= Joy Junction (charity) =

501(c)(3) Christian-based homeless shelter and church ministry

Joy Junction is a 501(c)(3) Christian-based homeless shelter and church ministry that offers emergency and short-term essentials such as food, clothing, counseling, transportation, and shelter to homeless individuals and families throughout Albuquerque, New Mexico. Joy Junction's motto is "giving the homeless a Hand Up, not a handout, to help them get back on their feet." Joy Junction opened in 1986 and has become the largest homeless shelter in New Mexico.

== Founder ==
Joy Junction was founded by Dr. Jeremy Reynalds, who immigrated from England to the United States in 1978, in 1986. He was born in England and immigrated to the United States in 1978, where he himself was homeless for a time. He died in 2018, but his work continues at Joy Junction.

== Organization and service to the homeless ==
Joy Junction's goal is to provide for the basic physical and spiritual needs of the homeless in Albuquerque. However, some neighborhoods have requested that the shelter's mobile truck not operate in their area. On average, Joy Junction serves as many as 300 people per day, including as many as 60 to 80 children; over 16,000 meals are provided to the homeless in Albuquerque every month, and 200,000 every year. A thrift shop was also added in 2023.

During the 2020 COVID-19 pandemic, their shelter accommodated an estimated 300 individuals nightly. They also provided private transportation, as an alternative for public transposition.

== Funding ==
Joy Junction relies on donations from individuals and businesses throughout New Mexico. Because Joy Junction is a non-profit donations-only charitable organization, the ministry receives no federal, state, or local government funding. The program is mainly funded through donations from individuals, businesses, and churches in the local area. Joy Junction also hosts public events to aid with its funding, such as the 2023 Halloween "Trick-or-Treat So Others May Eat" program, which encourages the donation of canned goods.
